Sukhothai may refer to:

 Sukhothai Kingdom, kingdom in Thailand, 1238–1583
 Sukhothai (city), historic capital of the kingdom
 Sukhothai Historical Park, the ruins of the city
 Sukhothai state, vassal state of Khmer empire in the 12th century.
 Sukhothai art, traditional Thai artwork from the Sukhothai Kingdom
 Sukhothai script, a Brahmic script which originated in the Sukhothai Kingdom
 Sukhothai Province, province in central northern Thailand
 Mueang Sukhothai District, capital district of the province
 New Sukhothai or Sukhothai Thani, the town and capital of the province
 Sukhothai F.C., football club based in Sukhothai Province
 Sukhothai Institute of Physical Education Stadium, multi-use stadium, home of the Sukhothai football club
 Sukhothai Thammathirat Open University, public university in Nonthaburi, Thailand
 HTMS Sukhothai, corvette in the Royal Thai Navy

See also